In 1999 the University of Nebraska–Lincoln installed FieldTurf in Memorial Stadium. In 2006, Nebraska installed new FieldTurf that alternates between two shades of green every five yards. Texas Tech University installed FieldTurf in Jones AT&T Stadium.
Nevada installed FieldTurf at its Mackay Stadium in 2000. The playing surface had been natural grass for 34 seasons.

FieldTurf was installed at Qwest Field (originally Seahawks Stadium) in 2002. The original plans called for a natural grass field at the new stadium, but due to the favorable reactions from players while playing at Husky Stadium, the Seahawks had FieldTurf installed instead.

On Tuesday, April 29, 2003, the Georgia World Congress Center Authority announced that it had selected FieldTurf as the new surface for the Georgia Dome, replacing the AstroTurf surface in use at the Dome since its inception in 1992.

Washington State University installed FieldTurf at its Martin Stadium in 2000. The University of Oregon installed NexTurf in Autzen Stadium in 2001 but the surface did not perform as expected and during remodeling in 2002 it was removed and replaced with FieldTurf. The University of Utah installed FieldTurf in 2002 and replaced it in 2009. Colorado State installed FieldTurf at its Hughes Stadium in 2006. The playing surface had been natural grass for 38 seasons.

The New England Patriots installed FieldTurf midway into the 2006 NFL season. The installation was made during a week when the team was on the road.

In 2004, Rutgers Stadium in Piscataway, New Jersey installed FieldTurf where the Rutgers Scarlet Knights football team plays. In 2007, the Saskatchewan Roughriders, a Canadian Football League (CFL) team, installed FieldTurf in Mosaic Stadium at Taylor Field. In April 2008, FieldTurf was installed at the new baseball stadium of Calvert Hall High School in Towson, Maryland, designed by Baltimore Orioles baseball great Cal Ripken.

National Football League (NFL)
CenturyLink Field in Seattle, Washington – 2002, 2008
Ford Field in Detroit, Michigan – 2002 (original), 2013
Georgia Dome in Atlanta – 2003, 2011
Gillette Stadium in Foxborough, Massachusetts – 2006 (26 Nov)
Lucas Oil Stadium in Indianapolis, Indiana – 2008
Mercedes-Benz Stadium in Atlanta – 2017

NFL practice facilities
Atlanta Falcons
Cleveland Browns, Lou Groza Center
Detroit Lions, Lions Practice Facility and Headquarters in Allen Park, Michigan
Green Bay Packers, Don Hutson Center
Jacksonville Jaguars
New England Patriots
San Diego Chargers, Chargers Park
Seattle Seahawks, VMAC Practice Facility
Washington Commanders

Canada
Clarke Park in Edmonton, Alberta
Commonwealth Stadium in Edmonton, Alberta
Edmonton Soccer Dome in Edmonton, Alberta
Investors Group Field in Winnipeg, Manitoba 
King George V Park in St. John's, Newfoundland
McMahon Stadium in Calgary, Alberta
Molson Stadium in Montreal
Mosaic Stadium at Taylor Field in Regina, Saskatchewan (2007)
Percy Perry Stadium / Town Centre Park (4 fields) in Coquitlam, British Columbia 
Port Moody Field in Port Moody, British Columbia
Raymond Field at Acadia University in Wolfville, Nova Scotia
TD Place Stadium in Ottawa, Ontario
University of Alberta in Edmonton, Alberta
University of Western Ontario (TD Waterhouse Stadium) in London, Ontario
Veterans Memorial Field in New Waterford, Nova Scotia
Warrior Field at University of Waterloo in Waterloo, Ontario

Major League Soccer
Gillette Stadium in Foxborough, Massachusetts
CenturyLink Field in Seattle
Providence Park in Portland, Oregon

Worldwide
Oriel Park in Dundalk, Ireland
Estadio Ricardo Saprissa in San José, Costa Rica
Luzhniki Stadium in Moscow, Russia
Borås Arena in Borås, Sweden
New Douglas Park in Hamilton, Scotland (now grass)
Tokyo Dome in Tokyo, Japan
Cardiff Arms Park in Cardiff, Wales
Rugby Park in Kilmarnock, Scotland
Priory Lane in Eastbourne, England

U.S. colleges
Abel Stadium at Nebraska Wesleyan University in Lincoln, Nebraska
Adams Field at Wayne State University in Detroit – 2006
AJ Knight Field at Worcester Polytechnic Institute in Worcester, Massachusetts – 2007
Al F. Caniglia Field at University of Nebraska at Omaha in Omaha, Nebraska
Albertsons Stadium (originally Bronco Stadium) at Boise State University in Boise, Idaho (continuing the stadium's uniqueness, the surface is colored blue)  
Andy Coakley Field (baseball) at Columbia University in New York City
Andy Kerr Stadium at Colgate University in Hamilton, New York
Arizona Stadium at The University of Arizona in Tucson, Arizona – 2013
Art Keller Field at Carthage College in Kenosha, Wisconsin
Autzen Stadium at the University of Oregon in Eugene, Oregon – 2002 – (Replaced NexTurf after one season of use)
Banta Bowl at Lawrence University in Appleton, Wisconsin
BB&T Field at Wake Forest University in Winston-Salem, North Carolina – Summer 2006
Biddle Field at Dickinson College in Carlisle, Pennsylvania – 2008
Bob Ford Field at University at Albany, SUNY in Albany, New York – 2013
Bob and Eveline Roberts P'10 Field at Steinbrenner Stadium at the Massachusetts Institute of Technology in Cambridge, Massachusetts
Brandenburg Field at Pittsburg State University in Pittsburg, Kansas
 Brown University: Berylson Family Fields (2007) and Richard Gouse Field at Brown Stadium (2021) in Providence, Rhode Island
Bruce R. Deaton Memorial Field (football, soccer) at Saint Xavier University in Chicago – 2006
Bridgeforth Stadium at James Madison University in Harrisonburg, Virginia
Brigham Field at Huskie Stadium at Northern Illinois University in DeKalb, Illinois – 2001, 2009
Buchanan Family Field in Washington, D.C.
Butler Bowl at Butler University in Indianapolis, Indiana
Cameron Stadium at Washington & Jefferson College in Washington, Pennsylvania
Camp Randall Stadium at the University of Wisconsin in Madison, Wisconsin – 2003, 2012
Capital One Field at Byrd Stadium at the University of Maryland in College Park, Maryland – 2012 – replaced natural grass
Cardinal Stadium at the University of Louisville in Louisville, Kentucky
Carrier Dome at Syracuse University in Syracuse, New York
Carson Park (Eau Claire, Wisconsin)
Christy Mathewson–Memorial Stadium at Bucknell University in Lewisburg, Pennsylvania
Commonwealth Stadium at University of Kentucky in Lexington, Kentucky – 2015 – replaced natural grass
Owen T. Carroll Field (baseball, soccer) at Seton Hall University in South Orange, New Jersey – 2006
Case Western Reserve University Stadium at Case Western Reserve University in Cleveland, Ohio
Class of 1952 Stadium at Princeton University in Princeton, New Jersey
Cougar Field at the University of Houston in Houston, Texas – 2013
D. Lloyd Wilson Field in Hastings, Nebraska
Darrell K Royal–Texas Memorial Stadium at the University of Texas in Austin, Texas – 2009 – replaced natural grass
Dix Stadium at Kent State University in Kent, Ohio
Don and Nona Williams Stadium at University of Wisconsin-Stout in Menomonie, Wisconsin
Donald J. Schneider Stadium at St. Norbert College in De Pere, Wisconsin
Depew Field (baseball) at Bucknell University in Lewisburg, Pennsylvania
Drake Stadium at Drake University in Des Moines, Iowa
Dudley Field at Vanderbilt University in Nashville, Tennessee
East Campus Stadium at Rensselaer Polytechnic Institute in Troy, New York
Ellis Field at Urbana University in Urbana, Ohio
Elwood Olsen Stadium at Morningside College in Sioux City, Iowa
Eringhaus Field (soccer) at University of North Carolina at Chapel Hill in Chapel Hill, North Carolina
Falcon Baseball Field at the United States Air Force Academy in Colorado Springs, Colorado
Falcon Stadium at the United States Air Force Academy in Colorado Springs, Colorado – 2006 – replaced natural grass
Foothill College in Los Altos Hills, California
Faurot Field at the University of Missouri in Columbia, Missouri
Fisher Field at Lafayette College in Easton, Pennsylvania
Foster Field at the University of Nebraska at Kearney in Kearney, Nebraska
FIU Stadium at Florida International University in Miami, Florida
Fred Selfe Stadium at Emory & Henry College in Emory, Virginia
Gayle and Tom Benson Stadium at the University of the Incarnate Word in San Antonio, Texas – 2018
Georgia State Stadium in Atlanta – 2017
Gettler Stadium in Cincinnati
Gesling Stadium at Carnegie Mellon University in Pittsburgh, Pennsylvania
Goerke Field at University of Wisconsin - Stevens Point in Stevens Point, Wisconsin
Goss Stadium at Oregon State University in Corvallis, Oregon (baseball – infield only)
Greer Field at Turchin Stadium at Tulane University in New Orleans, Louisiana – 2007
Growney Stadium at St. John Fisher College in Rochester, New York – 2005
Hank Crisp Indoor Facility at the University of Alabama in Tuscaloosa, Alabama 
Harvard Stadium at Harvard University in Allston, Massachusetts
Hollingsworth Field at Vaught–Hemingway Stadium at the University of Mississippi in Oxford, Mississippi – 2009 – replaced AstroPlay
Husky Stadium at the University of Washington in Seattle, Washington – 2000, 2009, 2013 (the surface's success at this stadium led to its selection by the Seattle Seahawks for use at Qwest Field) – 2002
Hotchkiss Field at Gallaudet University in Washington, D.C. – completed in Fall 2008
Houchens Industries–L. T. Smith Stadium at Western Kentucky University in Bowling Green, Kentucky
Hansen Stadium at Dixie State College of Utah in St. George, Utah
Illinois Field (baseball) at the University of Illinois at Urbana–Champaign in Champaign, Illinois – 2007
Ingalls Field at Ripon College (Wisconsin) in Ripon, Wisconsin
Jake Christiansen Stadium at Concordia College in Moorhead, Minnesota – 2010
Jim Sweeney Field at Bulldog Stadium at California State University, Fresno in Fresno, California – 2011
Joan C. Edwards Stadium at Marshall University in Huntington, West Virginia – 2005 – replaced AstroTurf
Joe Walton Stadium at Robert Morris University in Moon Township, Pennsylvania
Jonah Field at War Memorial Stadium at the University of Wyoming in Laramie, Wyoming
Jones AT&T Stadium at Texas Tech University in Lubbock, Texas
Kelly/Shorts Stadium at Central Michigan University in Mount Pleasant, Michigan – 2004
Kessler Field at Monmouth University in West Long Branch, New Jersey
Kinnick Stadium at the University of Iowa in Iowa City, Iowa
Krenzler Field (soccer) at Cleveland State University in Cleveland, Ohio
Kidd Brewer Stadium at Appalachian State University in Boone, North Carolina – 2003
Sofield Indoor Center at Appalachian State University in Boone, North Carolina – 2007
Ladd–Peebles Stadium – municipally-owned stadium in Mobile, Alabama hosting the Senior Bowl, GoDaddy.com Bowl, Pioneer Bowl and home to the University of South Alabama Jaguars football team
Legion Field – a municipally-owned stadium in Birmingham, Alabama used by the University of Alabama at Birmingham
Liston Stadium at Baker University in Baldwin City, Kansas
Larry Mahaney Diamond at the University of Maine in Orono, Maine
Leonidoff Field at Marist College in Poughkeepsie, New York
Mackay Stadium at University of Nevada in Reno, Nevada – 2000 – replaced natural grass, 2010
UC Baseball Stadium (baseball) at the University of Cincinnati in Cincinnati – 2004
Martin Stadium at Washington State University in Pullman, Washington – 2000 – replaced sand-filled Omni-turf
Mazzella Field and Rice Oval at Iona College in New Rochelle, New York – completed in Fall 2007
McCulloch Stadium at Willamette University in Salem, Oregon
Memorial Stadium at the University of Illinois at Urbana–Champaign in Champaign, Illinois – 2008 – replaced GameDay Grass, plus:
 Memorial Stadium at the University of Kansas in Lawrence, Kansas
 Memorial Stadium at the University of Nebraska in Lincoln, Nebraska (the first college-only football stadium to use FieldTurf in 1999), plus these other facilities at the school:
 Hawks Championship Center – Nebraska Cornhuskers indoor training facility
 Ed and Joyanne Gass Practice Fields – Nebraska Cornhuskers outdoor training facility
 Cook Pavilion – University Campus Recreation facility
 Vine Street Fields – University Campus Recreation intramural fields
 Mabel Lee Fields – University Campus Recreation intramural fields
Michie Stadium at the United States Military Academy in West Point, New York
 Michigan Stadium at the University of Michigan in Ann Arbor, Michigan (2003), (2010), plus:
 Oosterbaan Fieldhouse, the football program's indoor practice facility (2001)
 Mooradian Field at the University of New Hampshire in Durham, New Hampshire
 Motamed Field (lacrosse, soccer) at Adelphi University in Garden City, New York – 2008
 Mountaineer Field at Milan Puskar Stadium at the West Virginia University in Morgantown, West Virginia
 Multi-Sport Field at Georgetown University in Washington, D.C.
 Municipal Stadium at Hope College in Holland, Michigan – 2012
 Navy–Marine Corps Memorial Stadium at the United States Naval Academy in Annapolis, Maryland (2005),
 Nicholson Fieldhouse at the University of Central Florida in Orlando, Florida – 2005
 Nogoesco Field (soccer) at the University of San Francisco in San Francisco
 Notre Dame Stadium at the University of Notre Dame in Notre Dame, Indiana – including indoor and outdoor practice fields
O'Shaugnessy Stadium in St. Paul, Minnesota
Oakland University in Rochester, Michigan (First installation in Michigan) – 1998
Ohio Stadium at Ohio State University in Columbus, Ohio – 2007
 Ohio State University Marching Band practice facility at The Ohio State University in Columbus, Ohio
Oliver C. Dawson Stadium at South Carolina State University in Orangeburg, South Carolina – 2006
Peoples Bank Field at Ottawa University in Ottawa, Kansas – 2007
Perkins Stadium at University of Wisconsin-Whitewater in Whitewater, Wisconsin
Plaster Sports Complex at Missouri State University in Springfield, Missouri
Princeton Stadium at Princeton University in Princeton, New Jersey
Providence Park at Portland State University in Portland, Oregon
Ralph E. Davis Pioneer Stadium at University of Wisconsin–Platteville
Ramer Field at University of Wisconsin-River Falls in River Falls, Wisconsin
Reser Stadium at Oregon State University in Corvallis, Oregon – 2005
Rice Stadium at Rice University in Houston, Texas
Rice-Eccles Stadium at the University of Utah in Salt Lake City, Utah
Robert K. Kraft Field at Lawrence A. Wien Stadium at Columbia University in New York – 2005
Rockbowl Stadium at Loras College in Dubuque, Iowa
Rooney Field at Duquesne University in Pittsburgh, Pennsylvania
Roos Field at Eastern Washington University in Cheney, Washington has red turf
Ross Memorial Park and Alexandre Stadium at Washington & Jefferson College
Rutgers Stadium at Rutgers University in Piscataway, New Jersey
Rynearson Stadium at Eastern Michigan University in Ypsilanti, Michigan – original installation in 2005, replaced with a new gray FieldTurf surface in 2014
Roy Stewart Stadium at Murray State University in Murray, Kentucky 2007
Saluki Stadium at Southern Illinois University Carbondale in Carbondale, Illinois (2010)
Scheumann Stadium at Ball State University in Muncie, Indiana
Schneider Stadium at Carroll University in Waukesha, Wisconsin
Schoellkopf Field at Cornell University in Ithaca, New York- 2008
Seth Grove Stadium at Shippensburg University in Shippensburg, Pennsylvania – 2010
Simon Field at Doane College in Crete, Nebraska
Skelly Field at H. A. Chapman Stadium at the University of Tulsa in Tulsa, Oklahoma – 2000, 2013
Sonny Lubick Field at Hughes Stadium at Colorado State University in Fort Collins, Colorado – 2006 – replaced natural grass
South Recreational Area Fields at Virginia Tech in Blacksburg, Virginia – 2015
Stagg Field at Springfield College in Springfield, Massachusetts – 2007
TCF Bank Stadium at the University of Minnesota in Minneapolis – 2009
Terwilliger Brothers Field at Max Bishop Stadium (baseball) at the U.S. Naval Academy in Annapolis, Maryland – 2005
Titan Stadium at University of Wisconsin–Oshkosh in Oshkosh, Wisconsin – 2005
Tom Adams Field at Wayne State University in Detroit – 2006
Tubby Raymond Field at Delaware Stadium at the University of Delaware in Newark, Delaware
Van Andel Soccer Stadium at Hope College in Holland, Michigan – 2009
Vendetti Field at Nichols College in Dudley, Massachusetts – 2005
Harring Field at Veterans Memorial Stadium (La Crosse) at University of Wisconsin-La Crosse in La Crosse, Wisconsin
Virtue Field (lacrosse, soccer) at University of Vermont in Burlington, Vermont – 2012
Waldo Stadium at Western Michigan University in Kalamazoo, Michigan – 2006
Walter J. Zable Stadium at The College of William and Mary in Williamsburg, Virginia – 2006
Walkup Skydome at Northern Arizona University in Flagstaff, Arizona – 2008 – replaced AstroTurf
Warren McGuirk Alumni Stadium at University of Massachusetts Amherst in Amherst, Massachusetts – 2006
William J. Bonomo Memorial Field at Adelphi University in Garden City, New York – Baseball, 2007
Williams Stadium at Liberty University in Lynchburg, Virginia
Wish Field at DePaul University in Chicago – 2005
Xavier University Soccer Complex in Cincinnati
Yager Stadium at Miami University in Oxford, Ohio

U.S. high schools

Alabama
Cullman High School, Cullman, Alabama 2010

Alaska
Anchorage Football Stadium, Anchorage, Alaska 1999,
Dimond High Alumni Field, Anchorage, Alaska
Chugiak Stadium, Chugiak, Alaska – 2008
Mulcahy Stadium, Anchorage, Alaska 2009

Arizona
Arcadia High School – Scottsdale, Arizona – 2010
Chaparral High School – Scottsdale, Arizona – 2009
Marana High School – Tucson, Arizona – 2013
Maricopa High School – Maricopa, Arizona – 2014
Mountain View High School – Tucson, Arizona – 2013
Winslow High School – Winslow, Arizona – 2008

California
Trabuco Hills High School – Mission Viejo, California – 2006
Pittsburg High School – Pittsburg, California – 2003
Gonsalves Stadium – Clayton Valley High School, Concord, California – 2004
The Bishop's School, La Jolla, California
Ted Slavin Field – Harvard-Westlake School, North Hollywood – 2003
Los Altos High School – Los Altos
Carl Anderson Football Field – Mountain View – 2003
Amador Valley High School – Pleasanton – 2000
Pat Tillman Stadium – Leland High School, San Jose, California – 2004
La Canada High School – La Cañada Flintridge, California
Los Altos High School – Los Altos, California
Rancho Bernardo High School – San Diego – 2005
Redwood High School – Larkspur – 2004
Torrey Pines High School – San Diego – 2003
Vista High School – Vista – 2004
Mount Carmel High School – San Diego – 2005
Marin Catholic High School – Kentfield – 2006
Marin Academy – San Rafael – 1999
Mission Viejo High School–Mission Viejo, California-2006
Laguna Hills High School–Laguna Hills, California-2006
La Jolla High School–La Jolla, California
Saratoga High School–Saratoga, California-2004
Berkeley High School–Berkeley, California-2006
Reedley High School–Reedley, California-2006
Madera High School – Madera, California – 2006
Central High School – Fresno, California – 2007
Saint Francis High School, La Canada-Flintridge, California-2004
Loyola High School, Los Angeles – 2006
Point Loma High School, San Diego – 2000
Sonora High School – Sonora, California
Oakdale High School – Oakdale, California
Mountain View High School – Mountain View, California
Del Mar High School San Jose, California – original installation in 2006, replaced with a new FieldTurf surface in 2017
Ygnacio Valley High School Concord, California – 2006

Connecticut 

 East Hartford High School- East Hartford, Connecticut
 Glastonbury High School – Glastonbury, Connecticut – 2007
 Guilford High School – Guilford, Connecticut – 2008
 Hamden High School – Hamden, Connecticut-2001
 King Low Heywood Thomas – Stamford, Connecticut- 2007
 Kingswood-Oxford School – West Hartford, Connecticut- 2007
 Manchester High School - Manchester, Connecticut- 2016
 Norwalk High School – Norwalk, Connecticut – 1999, Re-installed in 2010
 Norwich Free Academy – Norwich, Connecticut – 2010
 Ridgefield High School – Ridgefield, Connecticut- 2001
 St. Luke's School – New Canaan, Connecticut – 2006
 Stamford High School – Stamford, Connecticut – 2011
 Wethersfield High School – Wethersfield, Connecticut – 2004
 Wilton High School – Wilton, Connecticut – 2003
 Windham High School - Willimantic, Connecticut - 2022 (Under construction)

Colorado
Dutch Clark Stadium–Pueblo, Colorado-2005

Delaware
DeGroat Field – Tower Hill School, Wilmington, Delaware

District of Columbia
St. Johns Upper Field – (St. John's College High School), Washington, D.C.

Florida

St. Thomas Aquinas High School, Brian Piccolo Stadium, Fort Lauderdale – 2007
Bishop Verot High School (Fort Myers, Florida)- 2007
Palm Bay High School (Melbourne, Florida)
Melbourne Central Catholic High School (Melbourne, Florida) – 2006
Jesuit High School of Tampa
Lake Mary High School - 2014

Georgia
McEachern High School, Powder Springs – 2005
Callaway Stadium, LaGrange- 2004
Grisham Stadium, Carrollton – 2008
Hoskyn Stadium, Riverwood High School – Sandy Springs – 2007
Staples Stadium, Heard County High School – Franklin – 2008
Union County High School – Blairsville – 2011
Etowah High School, Woodstock – 2009
Lumpkin County High School, Dahlonega, Georgia – 2009
McConnell-Talbert Stadium (Playing field of Houston County, Warner Robins, and Northside high schools) Warner Robins, Georgia – to be installed in 2015

Hawaii
Aloha Stadium, Honolulu, Hawaii
Clarence T.C. Ching Field, University of Hawaiʻi at Mānoa, Honolulu, Hawaii
Hugh Yoshida Stadium, Leilehua High School, Wahiawa, Hawaii
John Kauinana Stadium, Mililani High School, Mililani, Hawaii
James B. Castle High School, Kaneohe, Hawaii
Kamehameha Schools Maui Campus, Pukalani, Hawaii
President Theodore Roosevelt High School, Honolulu, Hawaii
Saint Louis School, Honolulu, Hawaii

Indiana
Avon High School – Avon, Indiana
Ben Davis High School – Indianapolis, Indiana
Evansville Bosse High School – Evansville, Indiana – 2009
Brebeuf Jesuit Preparatory School – Indianapolis, Indiana – 2011
Carmel High School – Carmel, Indiana
Cathedral High School – Indianapolis, Indiana
Center Grove High School – Greenwood, Indiana
Crown Point High School – Crown Point, Indiana
Evansville Central High School – Evansville, Indiana – 2009
Evansville Reitz High School – Evansville, Indiana – 2009
Gibson Southern High School – Fort Branch, Indiana – 2014
Greenwood Community High School – Greenwood, Indiana – 2012
Hamilton Southeastern High School – Fishers, Indiana
Hobart High School – Hobart, Indiana – 2009
Homestead High School – Fort Wayne, Indiana
Knightstown High School – Knightstown, Indiana – 2012
Lafayette Jefferson High School – Lafayette, Indiana
Lawrence Central High School – Indianapolis, Indiana
Lawrence North High School – Indianapolis, Indiana
Merrillville High School – Merrillville, Indiana
North Central High School – Indianapolis, Indiana
Pike High School – Indianapolis, Indiana – 2007
Plainfield High School – Plainfield, Indiana
Roncalli High School – Indianapolis, Indiana
Southridge High School – Huntingburg, Indiana – 2010
Warren Central High School – Indianapolis, Indiana – 2003
Valparaiso High School - Valparaiso, Indiana - 2007
Zionsville Community High School – Zionsville, Indiana

Illinois
Champaign Central High School, Champaign
Carmel Catholic High School, Mundelein
Lake Zurich High School, Lake Zurich
Libertyville High School, Libertyville
Lincoln-Way Central High School, New Lenox
Lincoln-Way East High School, Frankfort
Marian Catholic High School, Chicago Heights
Riverside Brookfield High School, Riverside
St. Ignatius College Prep, Chicago
Wheaton North High School, Wheaton
Wheaton Warrenville South High School, Wheaton
Evanston Township High School, Evanston, Illinois
Niles West High School, Skokie
Grayslake North High School, Grayslake, Illinois
Grayslake Central High School, Grayslake, Illinois
Nazareth Academy, La Grange Park, Illinois
Warren Township High School, Gurnee, Illinois
St. Rita of Cascia High School, Chicago
Ridgewood High School (Illinois), Norridge, Illinois
Elmwood Park High School, Elmwood Park, Illinois
Vernon Hills High School, Vernon Hills, Illinois
 Pinckneyville Community High School, Pinckneyville, Illinois
 Du Quoin High School, Du Quoin, Illinois
 Carterville High School, Carterville, Illinois
 Johnston City High School, Johnston City, Illinois
 Montini Catholic High School, Lombard, Illinois
 Homewood-Flossmoor High School, Flossmoor, Illinois
Providence Catholic High School, New Lenox, Illinois
Joliet West High School, Joliet, Illinois
Lemont High School, Lemont, Illinois

Iowa
Johnston High School, Johnston, Iowa, used by Johnston High School athletics and occasionally Dowling Catholic High School athletics – 2005
Urbandale High School, Urbandale, Iowa, Used by Urbandale High School Athletics – 2008
Newton High School, Newton, Iowa, used by Newton High School
Beckman High School, Dyersville, Iowa, used by Beckman High School Athletics – 2010
Kingston Stadium, Cedar Rapids, Iowa, Used by all three metro high school athletics – 2009
Linn-Mar Stadium, Marion, Iowa, Used for Linn-Mar High School Athletics- Spring 2011
 Clear Creek Amana High School, Tiffin, Iowa

Kansas
Andover District Stadium, Andover, used by Andover High School and Andover Central High School.
Blue Valley High School, Stilwell, used by Blue Valley High school and Blue Valley West High School.
Chanute Community Sports Complex, Chanute – 2004
Goddard High School, Goddard – 2000
Fischer Field, Newton – 2004, current home to KSHSAA 8-man state football championships.
Gowans Stadium, Hutchinson – 2005, also used by Hutchinson Community College
Hummer Sports Complex, Topeka – 2003
Hutchinson Field, Pittsburg- 2006, used by Pittsburg High School and Colgan-St. Mary's High School
Memorial Stadium, Dodge City – 2006, also used by Dodge City Community College
Memorial Stadium, Garden City – 2004, also used by Garden City Community College
Stanley Stadium, Rose Hill, Kansas – 2005, used by Rose Hill Junior Football, Rose Hill Middle School, and Rose Hill High School.
Veterans Memorial Stadium, Coffeyville – 2003, also used by Coffeyville Community College.
Wichita Collegiate School, Wichita – 2011
Circle District Stadium, Towanda, Kansas, used by Circle High School and Circle Recreation athletic teams.
All Wichita public high schools have Matrix Turf from Hellas Construction. South, Heights, and Northwest have it on their main varsity fields, while Southeast, North, East, and West have it on their junior varsity fields since they do not have a varsity stadium.

Kentucky
 Joseph K. Ford Stadium, Lexington Catholic High School, Lexington – 1999
 Edgar McNab Field Beechwood High School, Fort Mitchell – 2001
 Marshall Stadium, Trinity High School, St. Matthews – 2005
 Steele Stadium, Owensboro Catholic High School, Owensboro – 2007

Louisiana
 Cougar Stadium – St. Thomas More Catholic High School, Lafayette, Louisiana – 2006
 Yockey Bernard Field at Harvey Peltier Stadium – Edward Douglas White Catholic High School, Thibodaux, Louisiana – 2013

Maine
 Fitzpatrick Stadium- Portland High School, Portland, Maine
 Weatherbee Sports Complex- Hampden Academy, Hampden, Maine

Maryland
Broadneck High School – Annapolis, Maryland – first high school with turf field
Hope Field and Brumbaugh Field, St. Andrew's Episcopal School, Potomac, Maryland
Riverdale Baptist School, Landover, Maryland

Massachusetts
 Hanson Memorial Field – Somerset Berkley Regional High School, Somerset, Massachusetts – 2013
 Oliver Ames High School, North Easton, Massachusetts – 2009
 Catholic Memorial High School, West Roxbury, Massachusetts
 Cawley Memorial Stadium, Lowell, Massachusetts
Donovan Field at Brother Gilbert Stadium – Malden Catholic High School, Malden, Massachusetts – 2004
 Hanlon Field Medway High School, Medway, Massachusetts- 2004
 Harvard Stadium, Allston, Massachusetts
 Hittenger Field- Belmont High School, Belmont, Massachusetts-2003
Auburn Memorial Field – Auburn High School (Massachusetts) – 2006
 Flyer Field – Framingham High School, Framingham, Massachusetts – 2006
 Manning Bowl- Lynn, Massachusetts
 Marciano Stadium Brockton High School, Brockton, Massachusetts
Milford High School, Milford, Massachusetts
 Arthur I. Hurd Field Oakmont Regional High School, Ashburnham, Massachusetts – 2007
 Mac Aldrich Field, B.M.C. Durfee High School, Fall River, Massachusetts
 Newton South High School, Newton, Massachusetts
Belmont Hill School, Belmont, Massachusetts
Walpole High School,  Walpole, Massachusetts
Woburn Memorial High School, Woburn, Massachusetts
 Alexo Tiger Stadium, Taunton High School, Taunton, Massachusetts- 2008
 Arthur Roberts Stadium, Holyoke High 
North Field, Medway High School Medway MA 2014
South Field, Medway High School Medway MA 2014School,  Holyoke, Massachusetts 2001
 World War II Veterans Memorial Field, Canton High School, Canton, Massachusetts – 2005
 Reading Memorial High School, Reading, Massachusetts – 2007
 Parker Middle School, Reading, Massachusetts – 2009
Worcester Academy, Worcester, Massachusetts – 2011
 Eugene V. Lovely Memorial Field – Andover, Massachusetts- 2007
W. Leo Shields Memorial Field, Barnstable (Planned)
Pembroke High School, Pembroke, Massachusetts

Michigan
Canton High School, Canton – 2003
Chelsea High School, Jerry Niehaus Field, Chelsea – 2008
Detroit Country Day School, Shaw Stadium, Beverly Hills – 1998 (first installation of FieldTurf in the United States for a high school)
Holland Christian High School, Holland – 2000
Huron High School, Ann Arbor – 2004
Jackson High School, Withington Community Stadium (shared stadium with Lumen Christi High School), Jackson – 2008
Otsego High School, Bulldog Stadium, Otsego – 2007
Pioneer High School, Ann Arbor – 2004
Pontiac High School, Wisner Stadium, Pontiac, Michigan – 2006 (Donated after use for Super Bowl XL practices ceased.)
Southfield High School, Southfield – 2003
Southfield-Lathrup High School, Lathrup Village – 2003
Saline High School, Saline – 2004

Minnesota
StarsDome – Academy of Holy Angels, Richfield, Minnesota – 2004
Lakeville North High School, Lakeville, Minnesota – 2008

Mississippi
Olive Branch High School – Olive Branch, Mississippi – 2008
Tupelo High School - Tupelo, Mississippi - 2016

Missouri
Francis Field – Washington University in St. Louis, St. Louis, Missouri – 2004
Pirate Stadium – Platte County High School, Platte City, Missouri – 2002
Rockhurst Field – Rockhurst High School, Kansas City, Missouri – 2001
Tiger Stadium – Excelsior Springs High School, Excelsior Springs, Missouri – 2004
Hickman High School Columbia, Missouri – 2006
Rock Bridge High School Columbia, Missouri – 2006
Klemm Field – Christian Brothers College High School St. Louis, Missouri – 2003
St. Louis University High School Field – St. Louis University High School, St. Louis, Missouri – Date Unknown

Nebraska
15 of the 16 teams in the METRO Conference, Nebraska's biggest (by school size) and most competitive conference, play on FieldTurf fields.

Bellevue West Stadium – Bellevue West, Bellevue, Nebraska – 2005
Benson Stadium – Omaha Benson, Omaha, Nebraska – 2008
Buell Stadium – Millard North, Millard South, Millard West, Omaha – 2005
Burke Stadium – Omaha Burke High School, Omaha – 2008
Chieftain Stadium – Bellevue East, Bellevue – 2008
Collin Stadium – Omaha South, Omaha – 2009
Kinnick Stadium – Omaha North, Omaha Northwest, Omaha – 2009
Papillion-La Vista Stadium – Papillion La Vista South High School, Papillion, Nebraska – 2003
Pioneer Field – Nebraska City High School, Lourdes Central Catholic, Nebraska City, Nebraska – 2008
Seacrest Field – Lincoln Public Schools, Lincoln, Nebraska – 2000
Seaman Stadium – Omaha Central High School, Omaha – 2005
Westside High School – Omaha – 2004

Nevada
Damonte Ranch High School Football Field – Damonte Ranch High School – Washoe County School District, Reno, Nevada – 2006
Golden Eagle Regional Park – City of Sparks, Washoe County, Nevada – 2008

New Hampshire
Hanover High School – Hanover, New Hampshire – Summer 2006, Multi-use field for Football, boys and girls Soccer and Lacrosse
Bedford High School – Bedford, New Hampshire – 2006, Multi-use field for football, boys and girls Soccer, Lacrosse, and Field Hockey.

New Jersey
Arthur L. Johnson High School – Clark, New Jersey – Summer 2008
Bergen Catholic – Oradell, New Jersey – Summer 1998 (third installation of FieldTurf in the United States for a high school)
Central Regional High School – Bayville, New Jersey – Fall 2014
Colonia High School – Colonia, New Jersey – Summer 2014
Don Bosco Prep – Ramsey, New Jersey – Spring 2004
Dwight-Englewood School – Englewood, New Jersey – May 2006
Dwight Morrow High School – Englewood, New Jersey – Fall 2008
Egg Harbor Township High School – Egg Harbor Township, New Jersey – November 2009
Governor Livingston High School – Berkeley Heights, New Jersey – September 2006
Hasbrouck Heights High School – Hasbrouck Heights, New Jersey – 2007
Holmdel High School – Holmdel, New Jersey – July 2006
Hun School of Princeton – Princeton, New Jersey – Summer 2004
Hunterdon Central High School – Flemington, New Jersey – Summer 2005
Mahwah High School – Mahwah, New Jersey – September 2006
Monmouth University – West Long Branch, New Jersey – Summer 2006
Northern Highlands Regional High School – Allendale, New Jersey – Spring 2008
Pascack Valley High School – Hillsdale, New Jersey – August 2005
Princeton Day School – Princeton, New Jersey – Summer 2003
 Riverfront Park – Newark, New Jersey – June 2012
North Hunterdon High School – Clinton, New Jersey – Spring 2006
Saint Joseph Regional High School – Montvale, New Jersey
Saint Peter's Preparatory High School – Jersey City, New Jersey
St. Augustine College Preparatory School – Richland, New Jersey – Summer/Fall 2005
Ramapo High School – Franklin Lakes, New Jersey
Raritan High School – Hazlet, New Jersey – June 2006
Rutgers Preparatory School – Somerset, New Jersey
Rutgers Stadium – Piscataway, New Jersey
 West Morris Mendham High School – Mendham, New Jersey – Summer 2008
West Windsor-Plainsboro High School North – Plainsboro, New Jersey – 2007
West Windsor-Plainsboro High School South – West Windsor, New Jersey – 2007
Gill St. Bernard's School – Gladstone, New Jersey – 2014

New York
Freeport High School – 2012
Victor Central School District – Victor, New York – 2007
Arlington High School – LaGrange, New York – 2007
Byram Hills High School – Armonk, New York – 2004
Colgate University – Hamilton, New York – 2007
Division Avenue High School – Levittown, New York – 2008
East Rochester High School – East Rochester, New York – 2001
Fairport High School (Joe Cummings Field) – Fairport, New York – 2008
Garden City High School – Garden City, New York – 2005
Gowanda High School (Baseball and Softball Fields)- Gowanda, New York - 2020
Huntington High School – Huntington, New York – 2007
Irondequoit High School – Irondequoit, New York – 2005
John Nugent Stadium – Rye, New York – 2004
Ed Walsh Field – Manhasset, New York – 2004
Butler Field – Scarsdale, New York – 2005
Walter Panas High School – Cortlandt Manor, New York – 2005
Monsignor Farrell High School- Staten Island, New York- 2005
St. Joseph by the Sea High School – Staten Island, New York – 2003
St. Peter's Boys High School – Staten Island, New York – 2006
Chaminade High School – Mineola, New York – September 2003
Brooklyn Technical High School – Fort Greene, Brooklyn -
George W. Hewlett High School – Hewlett, New York – 2003
Commack High School – Commack, New York – 2006
Manhasset High School – Manhasset, New York – 2003
Poly Prep Country Day School – Brooklyn, New York – 2007
Paul D. Schreiber High School – Port Washington, New York – 2006
Thomas A. Edison High School – Elmira Heights, New York – 2003
Walt Whitman High School – South Huntington, New York – 2008
Wantagh High School – Wantagh, New York – 2008
Yorkshire-Pioneer High School – Yorkshire, New York – 2008
Amsterdam High School – Amsterdam, New York – 2004
La Salle Institute – Troy, New York – 2018

North Carolina
Ardrey Kell High School – Charlotte, North Carolina- 2006
Mallard Creek High School- Charlotte, North Carolina- 2007
Rocky River High School- Mint Hill, North Carolina-

Ohio
Alumni Stadium – Jackson HS – Jackson, Ohio – 2003
Alumni Stadium – Perry HS – Perry, Ohio – 2006
Alumni Stadium – St. Francis DeSales HS – Columbus, Ohio – 2005
Anderson Field – Grandview Heights HS – Columbus, Ohio – 2007
Arrowhead Stadium – Girard HS – Girard, Ohio – 2008
Avon Stadium – Avon HS – Avon, Ohio – 2007
Bearcat Stadium – Bedford/Benedictine/Glenville/Trinity – Bedford, Ohio – 2004
Blue Streak Stadium – Lake HS – Uniontown, Ohio – 2008
Brunswick Auto Mart Stadium – Brunswick HS – Brunswick, Ohio – 2004
Cardinal Stadium – Canfield HS – Canfield, Ohio – 2006
Cardinal Stadium – Colerain HS – Cincinnati – 2003, 2013
Centerville Stadium – Centerville HS Centerville, Ohio – 2006
Coffman Stadium – Dublin Coffman HS – Dublin, Ohio
Coughlin Field – St. Edward HS – Lakewood, Ohio – 2004
Collinwood Stadium – Collinwood HS – Cleveland, Ohio – 2008
Community Stadium – Kenston HS – Chagrin Falls, Ohio – 2010
Copley Stadium – Copley-Fairlawn HS – Copley, Ohio – 2008
CS Harris Stadium – Chagrin Falls HS – Chagrin Falls, Ohio – 2005
Denison Park – Cleveland Heights HS – Cleveland Heights, Ohio – 2011
Don Paul Stadium – Fremont Ross /St Joseph Central Catholic, Fremont, Ohio – 2005
Donnell stadium – Findlay High School- Findlay, Ohio – 2007
Dowed Field – Archbishop Hoban HS – Akron, Ohio – 2004
Dr James B Daley Stadium – Fairview HS – Fairview Park, Ohio – 2010
Falcon Pride Stadium – Jefferson Area HS – Jefferson, Ohio – 2011
Falcon Stadium – Austintown-Fitch HS – Youngstown, Ohio – 2007
First National Bank Field - Bellevue HS - Bellevue, Ohio - 2013
Gallagher Stadium – Central Catholic High School – Toledo, Ohio – 2008
George Finnie Stadium, Tressel Field – Berea/Midpark – Berea, Ohio – 2008
Gilmour Stadium – Gilmour Academy – Gates Mills, Ohio – 2004
Green Street Stadium, John Cistone Field – St Vincent-St Mary – Akron, Ohio 2005
Indian Stadium – Valley HS – Lucasville, Ohio – 2000 (reinstalled 2014)
Jack Johnson Field – Harvest Preparatory School – Columbus, Ohio – 2008
Jerome Stadium – Dublin Jerome HS – Dublin, Ohio – 2004
Jerome T. Osbourne Sr. Stadium – Mentor HS/Mentor Lake Catholic – Mentor, Ohio – 2006
Jim Van de Grift Stadium – Lebanon HS Lebanon, Ohio – 2008
Joseph B Yost Stadium - Ellet HS Akron, Ohio-2019
Ken Dukes Stadium – Medina HS – Medina, Ohio – 2006
Korb Field – Brush HS – Lyndhurst, Ohio – 2002
Lakeside Stadium – Lakeside HS – Ashtabula, Ohio – 2006
Lakewood Stadium – Lakewood/St Edward – Lakewood, Ohio – 2007
Leopard Stadium – Louisville HS – Louisville, Ohio – 2010
Linder Field – Cincinnati Hills Christian Academy – Cincinnati – 2010
Massillon Paul Brown Tiger Stadium – Washington HS – Massillon, Ohio – 2007
Memorial Stadium – Avon Lake HS – Avon Lake, Ohio – 2010
Memorial Stadium, Don Hertler Sr. Field – Hoover HS – North Canton, Ohio – 2011
Memorial Stadium, InfoCision Field – Green HS – Green, Ohio – 2008
Moorehead Memorial Stadium – Upper Arlington HS – Columbus, Ohio – 2003
Mullenkopf Stadium – Warren G Harding HS/John F Kennedy HS – Warren, Ohio – 2005
Patterson Field – Dawson-Bryant HS – Coal Grove, Ohio – 2007
Pointer Stadium – South Point HS – South Point, Ohio – 2007
Purple Rider Stadium – Martins Ferry HS, Martins Ferry, Ohio – 2007
Ralph P Adams Stadium – Cuyahoga Heights HS – Cuyahoga Heights, Ohio – 2008
Ravenna Stadium, Gilcrest Field – Ravenna HS – Ravenna, Ohio – 2003
Robert Boulton Stadium, Byers Field – Normandy/Parma/St Ignatius/Valley Forge – Parma, Ohio – 2008
Rocky River Stadium – Rocky River HS – Rocky River, Ohio – 2004
Roush Stadium – Fairmont HS – Kettering, Ohio – 2005
Scioto Stadium – Dublin Scioto HS – Dublin, Ohio
Serpentini Chevrolet Stadium, Gibson Field – North Royalton HS – North Royalton, Ohio – 2011
Sirpilla Stadium – St. Thomas Aquinas HS – Louisville, Ohio – 2005
Stewart Field – Solon HS – Solon, Ohio – 2004
Tanks Memorial Stadium – Ironton City HS – Ironton, Ohio 2014
Tiger Stadium – Twinsburg HS – Twinsburg, Ohio – 2005
Veterans Stadium – Aurora HS – Aurora, Ohio – 2008
White Field – Newark HS – Newark, Ohio – 2015
William Boliantz Stadium – Nordonia HS – Macedonia, Ohio – 2010

Oklahoma
Jenks High School – Jenks, Oklahoma – 2000, 2008
Muskogee High School – Muskogee, Oklahoma – 2011
Sapulpa High School – Sapulpa, Oklahoma – 2005
Union HS – Tulsa, Oklahoma

Oregon
Aloha High School – Aloha, Oregon – 2004
Beaverton High School – Beaverton, Oregon – 2002
 Panther Stadium – Central High School – Independence, Oregon – 2010
Cottage Grove High School – Cottage Grove, Oregon – 2003
Mike Walsh Field – Portland, Oregon – 2002
Pete Susick Stadium – Marshfield High School, Coos Bay, Oregon – 2000
McMinnville High School – McMinnville, Oregon – 2008
North Bend High School – North Bend, Oregon – 2007
North Medford High School – Medford, Oregon – 2010
Sherwood High School – Sherwood, Oregon – 2004
South Medford High School – Medford, Oregon – 2010
South Salem High School – Salem, Oregon – 2008
Spiegelberg Stadium – Medford, Oregon – 2004
Sprague High School – Salem, Oregon – 2007
Stapleton Field – Gresham, Oregon – 2002
Sunset High School – Beaverton, Oregon – 2006
Tigard High School – Tigard, Oregon – 2008
West Salem High School – Salem, Oregon – 2004; replaced by a black FieldTurf surface in 2012 
Westview High School – Portland, Oregon – 2006
Willamette High School – Eugene, Oregon – 2008

Pennsylvania
The Haverford School – Haverford, Pennsylvania – 2009
School District of Philadelphia "SuperSites" at Northeast High School, Germantown, Dobbins and South Philadelphia
 Churchman Stadium – East Allegheny High School – North Versailles, Pennsylvania – 2000
J. Birney Crum Stadium – Allentown School District – Allentown, Pennsylvania – ?
Bethlehem Area School District Stadium – Bethlehem Area School District – Bethlehem, Pennsylvania – 2005
James M. Burk Memorial Stadium – Fox Chapel Area High School – O'Hara Township, Pennsylvania – 2007
John H. Frederick Field at Memorial Park Stadium – Mechanicsburg Area School District – Mechanicsburg, Pennsylvania – 2008
Linden Field – General McLane High School – Edinboro, Pennsylvania – 2007
Panthers Stadium – Central York High School – York, Pennsylvania – 2005
Paul J. Weitz Stadium – Harbor Creek High School – Harborcreek, Pennsylvania – 2004
Severance Field- Harrisburg High School- Harrisburg, Pennsylvania – 2004
Somerset Area Golden Eagle Stadium – Somerset Area High School – Somerset, Pennsylvania – 2007
Tiger Stadium – Hollidaysburg Area High School – Hollidaysburg, Pennsylvania – 2004
Titan Stadium – West Mifflin Area High School- West Mifflin, Pennsylvania – 2008
Trojan Stadium – Greater Johnstown High School – Johnstown, Pennsylvania – 2003
Turtle Creek Stadium/The Wolvarena – Woodland Hills High School – Pittsburgh– 2006
War Memorial Field – Warren Area High School – Warren, Pennsylvania – 1998

Rhode Island
Moses Brown School – Campanella Field – Providence, Rhode Island – 2007
Bishop Hendricken High School – Warwick, Rhode Island – 2006
North Smithfield High School – North Smithfield, Rhode Island – 2008

South Carolina
Myrtle Beach High School – Doug Shaw Memorial Stadium – Myrtle Beach, South Carolina – 2008
Rock Hill High School and Northwestern High School – District 3 Stadium – Rock Hill, South Carolina – 2008
Spartanburg High School – Spartanburg High School Athletic Field – Spartanburg, South Carolina – 2009

South Dakota
Central High School – Aberdeen, South Dakota – 2004
Garitson High School – Garitson, South Dakota – 2005

Tennessee
Montgomery Bell Academy – Tommy Owen Stadium – Nashville, Tennessee – 2006
Oakland High School – Patriot Stadium – Murfreesboro, Tennessee – 2007
Memphis University School – Hull Dobbs Field – Memphis, Tennessee – 2007
Christian Brothers High School – Memphis, Tennessee – 2007
Melrose High School – Melrose Stadium – Memphis, Tennessee – 2009
McCallie School – Spears Stadium – Chattanooga, Tennessee – 2009
Memphis Central High School – Crump Stadium – Memphis, Tennessee – 2012
Evangelical Christian School – Cordova, Tennessee – 2012
Harding Academy – Memphis, Tennessee – 2015
Hutchison School – Memphis, Tennessee
Grace Christian Academy – Knoxville, Tennessee
Christian Academy of Knoxville – Knoxville, Tennessee
Webb School of Knoxville – Knoxville, Tennessee
Knoxville Catholic High School – Knoxville, Tennessee
Maryville High School – Maryville, Tennessee
Alcoa High School – Alcoa, Tennessee
Sevier County High School – Sevierville, Tennessee
Dobyns-Bennett High School – Kingsport, Tennessee
Science Hill High School – Johnson City, Tennessee
Tennessee High School – Bristol, Tennessee
Rhea County High School – Evensville, Tennessee
Greeneville High School – Greeneville, Tennessee
Brentwood High School – Brentwood, Tennessee
Nolensville High School – Nolensville, Tennessee
Franklin High School – Franklin, Tennessee
Sullivan East High School - Bluff City, Tennessee

Texas
Amarillo Independent School District – Dick Bivins Stadium – Amarillo – 1998
Carroll Independent School District – Dragon Stadium – Southlake – 1999
Central Catholic High School – Bob Benson '66 Stadium – San Antonio – 2010
College Station Independent School District – Tiger Field – College Station – 2008
Corsicana Independent School District – Corsicana Tiger Stadium – Corsicana – 2006
Cypress-Fairbanks Independent School District – The Berry Center – Houston – 2006
Ector County Independent School District – Ratliff Stadium – Odessa – 2003
Hays Consolidated Independent School District – Bob Shelton Stadium – Buda – 2002
Round Rock Independent School District – RRISD Athletic Complex (The Parmer Palace) – Austin – 2003
Leander Independent School District – Leander
A.C. Bible Memorial Stadium – 2009
Rouse High School practice field – 2008
Cedar Park High School practice field – Cedar Park – 2007
Vista Ridge High School practice field – Cedar Park, – 2007
Navasota Independent School District – Rattler Stadium – Navasota – 2007
Spring Branch Independent School District – Darrel Tully Stadium – Houston – 2008
Snyder Independent School District – Tiger Stadium – Snyder
Strake Jesuit College Preparatory – Crusader Stadium – Houston
Wichita Falls Independent School District – Memorial Stadium – Wichita Falls

Virginia
Bishop Ireton High School – Alexandria, Virginia- 2006
Bishop O'Connell High School – Arlington, Virginia – 2012
Broad Run High School – Ashburn, Virginia – 2015
Briar Woods High School - Ashburn, Virginia - 2019
Episcopal High School – Hummel Bowl – Alexandria, Virginia – 2006
Fairfax High School – Harold Stalnaker Stadium – Fairfax, Virginia – 2005, 2015
George Mason High School – Falls Church, Virginia – 2006
Herndon High School – J.L. Griffiths Stadium – Herndon, Virginia – 2010
Highland School – Warrenton, Virginia – 2009
James Madison High School – Normand F. bradford, Jr. Stadium – Vienna, Virginia – 2007, 2017
Loudoun County High School – Leesburg, Virginia – 2014
Patrick Henry High School – Roanoke, Virginia – 2008, 2016
Salem High School – Salem, Virginia – 2006, 2016
West Springfield High School – Ronald J. Mobayed Memorial Stadium – Springfield, Virginia – 2006
William Fleming High School – Roanoke, Virginia – 2010, 2019
Yorktown High School – Arlington, Virginia – 2016
Christiansburg High School – Christiansburg, Virginia- 2017
Blacksburg High School – Blacksburg, Virginia- 2020
Glenvar High School – Salem, Virginia- 2019
William Byrd High School – Vinton, Virginia- 2016

Washington
Bellevue School District
Newport High School – Bellevue, Washington – 2001
Bellevue High School – Bellevue, Washington – 2003
Sammamish High School – Bellevue, Washington – 2003
Clover Park School District
Clover Park High School – Lakewood, Washington – 2000
Edmonds School District
Edmonds School District Stadium – Edmonds, Washington – 2005
Lynnwood High School – Lynnwood, Washington – 2001
Meadowdale High School – Lynnwood, Washington – 2006
Kennewick School District
Neil F. Lampson Stadium – Kennewick, Washington – 2006
Southridge High School soccer field – Kennewick, Washington – 2008
Wilson Youth Sports Complex – Kent, Washington – 2004
Lake Washington School District
Eastlake High School – Sammamish, Washington – 2004
Juanita High School (Bergh Field) – Kirkland, Washington – 2002
Lake Washington High School – Kirkland, Washington – 2002
Mukilteo School District
Mariner High School (Goddard Stadium) – Everett, Washington – 2007
Mercer Island School District
Mercer Island High School – Mercer Island, Washington – 2002
Northshore School District
Inglemoor High School – Kenmore, Washington – 2005
Olympia School District
Olympia High School (Ingersoll Stadium) – Olympia, Washington – 2004
Pasco School District
Edgar Brown Memorial Stadium – Pasco, Washington – 2003
Chiawana High School – Pasco, Washington – 2009
Shoreline School District
Shoreline Stadium – Shoreline, Washington – 2006
Tumwater School District
Tumwater High School (Tumwater Stadium) – Tumwater, Washington – 2004
University Place School District
Curtis High School (Viking Stadium) – University Place, Washington – 2000
Washougal School District
Washougal High School (Fishback Stadium) – Washougal, Washington

Wisconsin
Altoona High School- Altoona, Wisconsin
Amherst High School- Amherst, Wisconsin
Appleton East High School- Appleton, Wisconsin
Appleton North High School- Appleton, Wisconsin
Appleton West High School- Appleton, Wisconsin
Arcadia High School- Arcadia, Wisconsin
Arrowhead High School- Hartland, Wisconsin
Ashwaubenon High School- Ashwaubenon, Wisconsin
Bay Port High School- Suamico, Wisconsin
Big Foot High School- Walworth, Wisconsin
Brookfield Central High School- Brookfield, Wisconsin
Cameron High School- Cameron, Wisconsin
Chippewa Falls High School- Chippewa Falls, Wisconsin
Cumberland High School- Cumberland, Wisconsin
De Pere High School- De Pere, Wisconsin
D.C. Everest High School- Schofield, Wisconsin
Eau Claire Memorial High School- Eau Claire, Wisconsin
Eau Claire North High School- Eau Claire, Wisconsin
Elkhorn High School- Elkhorn, Wisconsin
Fall River High School- Fall River, Wisconsin
Franklin High School- Franklin, Wisconsin
Gale-Ettrick-Trempealau High School- Galesville, Wisconsin
Green Bay East High School- Green Bay, Wisconsin
Green Bay Southwest High School- Green Bay, Wisconsin
Greendale High School- Greendale, Wisconsin
Homestead High School- Mequon, Wisconsin
Hortonville High School- Hortonville, Wisconsin
Hudson High School- Hudson, Wisconsin
Kaukauna High School- Kaukauna, Wisconsin
Kenosha Bradford High School- Kenosha, Wisconsin
Kenosha Indian Trail High School- Kenosha, Wisconsin
Kenosha Tremper High School- Kenosha, Wisconsin
Kettle Moraine High School- Wales, Wisconsin
Kewauskum High School- Kewauskum, Wisconsin
Kiel High School- Kiel, Wisconsin
Kimberly High School- Kimberly, Wisconsin
Kohler High School- Kohler, Wisconsin
La Crosse Logan High School- La Crosse, Wisconsin
Lakeland Union High School- Minocqua, Wisconsin
Lake Mills High School- Lake Mills, Wisconsin
Lomira High School- Lomira, Wisconsin
Madison East High School- Madison, Wisconsin
Madison Edgewood High School- Madison, Wisconsin
Manitowoc Lincoln High School- Manitowoc, Wisconsin
Marquette High School- Milwaukee, Wisconsin
Marshfield High School- Marshfield, Wisconsin
McFarland High School- McFarland, Wisconsin
Medford High School- Medford, Wisconsin
Menasha High School- Menasha, Wisconsin
Menomonee Falls High School- Menomonee Falls, Wisconsin
Menomonie High School- Menomonie, Wisconsin
Middleton High School- Middleton, Wisconsin
Milwaukee Obama SCTE High School- Milwaukee, Wisconsin
Milwaukee Pulaski High School- Milwaukee, Wisconsin
Milwaukee South High School- Milwaukee, Wisconsin
Milwaukee Vincent High School- Milwaukee, Wisconsin
Mukwonago High School- Mukwonago, Wisconsin
Muskego High School- Muskego, Wisconsin
Northwestern High School- Maple, Wisconsin
Notre Dame Academy- Green Bay, Wisconsin
Oak Creek High School- Oak Creek, Wisconsin
Oconomowoc High School- Oconomowoc, Wisconsin
Osceola High School- Osceola, Wisconsin
Oshkosh North High School- Oshkosh, Wisconsin
Oshkosh West High School- Oshkosh, Wisconsin
Pacelli High School- Stevens Point, Wisconsin
Pewaukee High School- Pewaukee, Wisconsin
Platteville High School- Platteville, Wisconsin
Pius XI High School- Milwaukee, Wisconsin
Port Washington High School- Port Washington, Wisconsin
Pulaski High School- Pulaski , Wisconsin
Regis High School- Eau Claire, Wisconsin
Rhinelander High School- Rhinelander, Wisconsin
Rice Lake High School- Rice Lake, Wisconsin
Ripon High School- Ripon, Wisconsin
River Falls High School- River Falls, Wisconsin
Shorewood High School- Shorewood, Wisconsin
Slinger High School- Slinger, Wisconsin
Stanley-Boyd High School- Stanley, Wisconsin
Stevens Point Area Senior High- Stevens Point, Wisconsin
Superior High School- Superior, Wisconsin
Union Grove High School- Union Grove, Wisconsin
University School of Milwaukee- Milwaukee, Wisconsin
Waukesha North High School- Waukesha, Wisconsin
Waukesha South High School- Waukesha, Wisconsin
Waukesha West High School- Waukesha, Wisconsin
Waunakee High School- Waunakee, Wisconsin
Waupaca High School- Waupaca, Wisconsin
Wauwatosa School District- Wauwatosa, Wisconsin
West Allis – West Milwaukee School District- West Allis, Wisconsin
West Bend School District- West Bend, Wisconsin
West De Pere High School- De Pere, Wisconsin
Westosha Central High School- Salem, Wisconsin
Whitefish Bay High School- Whitefish Bay, Wisconsin
Whitnall High School- Greenfield, Wisconsin
Wilmot Union High School- Wilmot, Wisconsin

Canadian high schools

British Columbia
Dr. Charles Best Secondary School – Coquitlam
Southridge School – Surrey

Saskatchewan
Centennial Collegiate – Saskatoon

Ontario
St. Marcellinus High School – Mississauga

References
FieldTurf: high-profile installations
Landtek Group: Authorized Field Turf Representative 

FieldTurf installations
Artificial turf
FieldTurf
FieldTurf installations
FieldTurf installations